Allan Craig Douglas (born 17 February 1958 in Bermuda) is a former Bermudian cricketer. He was a right-handed batsman and a wicket-keeper. He played two List A matches for Bermuda in the 1996 Red Stripe Bowl. He also played in three ICC Trophy tournaments, including the 1982 event in which Bermuda finished as runners-up to Zimbabwe.

References
 Cricket Archive profile
 Cricinfo profile

1958 births
Living people
Bermudian cricketers
Bermudian cricket coaches
Coaches of the Bermuda national cricket team
Wicket-keepers